The 1976 Women's World Open Squash Championship was the inaugural women's edition of the 1976 World Open, which serves as the individual world championship for squash players.

The event took place at the Stafford Courts in Brisbane in Australia from 18–23 August 1976. Heather McKay won the World Open title, defeating Marion Jackman in the final in just 22 minutes. McKay picked up $2,000 (the biggest winning cheque of her career) for winning the competition.

Results

First round

Second round

Quarter-finals

Semi-finals

Final

See also
World Open
1976 Men's World Open Squash Championship

References

External links
Women's World Open

1976 in squash
World Squash Championships
1976 in women's squash
Squash tournaments in Australia
International sports competitions hosted by Australia
1976 in Australian sport
August 1976 sports events in Australia
1976 in Australian women's sport